Doug Davies (born 6 August 1936) is a former international speedway rider from South Africa.

Speedway career 
Davies reached the final of the Speedway World Championship in the 1956 Individual Speedway World Championship.

He rode in the top tier of British Speedway from 1954–61, riding for Birmingham Brummies and New Cross Rangers.

World final appearances

Individual World Championship
 1956 –  London, Wembley Stadium – 13th – 4pts

References 

1936 births
Living people
South African speedway riders
Birmingham Brummies riders
New Cross Rangers riders